Alfred George Fry (1864 – 15 May 1930) was an English footballer. Born in Southampton, Fry was one of the first players for St. Mary's Y.M.A. (later renamed St. Mary's), between 1885 and 1888, playing as a half-back.

Life and career
Originally from Southampton, Alfred Fry was one of the first players to join St. Mary's Y.M.A., playing in the team's first match in November 1885. Primarily a half-back, Fry made two competitive appearances in the club's third season, in the 1–0 win over Totton and the 10–0 win over Petersfield, both in the Hampshire Junior Cup. Following his retirement from football, Fry went on to become a "prominent builder" in the area; he died in 1930, aged 66.

Career statistics

References

1864 births
English footballers
Association football defenders
Southampton F.C. players
1930 deaths